Fernando Iório Rodrigues (June 23, 1929 in Maceió – March 20, 2010) was a Brazilian Roman Catholic prelate and professor, who served as the Bishop of the Roman Catholic Diocese of Palmeira dos Índios, based in Palmeira dos Índios, from March 1, 1985, until July 12, 2006.

Rodrigues was ordained a Roman Catholic priest in 1953. He was hospitalized in March 2010 for ten days at Santa Casa de Misericórdia de Maceió due to heart problems, before his death.

See also

References

External links
Catholic Hierarchy: Bishop Fernando Iório Rodrigues †

1929 births
2010 deaths
20th-century Roman Catholic bishops in Brazil
Brazilian academics
People from Maceió
21st-century Roman Catholic bishops in Brazil
Roman Catholic bishops of Palmeira dos Índios